Bhasha Shaheed Abdus Salam Stadium also known as Shaheed Salam Stadium is a football stadium in Feni, Bangladesh. The stadium is named to honor the 1952 Bengali Language Movement martyr Abdus Salam. The stadium is a regular of host of national day parade, professional as well as district level football league matches.

Hosting National Sporting Event 
The venue was the zonal host of 5th National Football Championship from September 15–26 in 2005

Current Status 
It is the home ground of Bangladesh Championship League (football) team Feni Soccer Club.

See also
List of football stadiums in Bangladesh

References

Football venues in Bangladesh